Rødseth is a surname. Notable people with the surname include:

Asbjørn Rødseth (born 1951), Norwegian economist
John Rødseth (born 1947), Norwegian sport shooter
Martine Rødseth (born 1991), Norwegian flight attendant, receptionist and beauty pageant titleholder 
Tor Rødseth (1928–2007), Norwegian economist